Pacific Place is a complex of office towers and hotels and a shopping centre situated at 88 Queensway, Admiralty, Hong Kong. The latest phase, Three Pacific Place, is located at 1 Queen's Road East, Wan Chai.

The four-level shopping centre is home to over 160 shops and boutiques and one major department store. The complex is also home to three five-star hotels, a boutique hotel, three office towers and 270 serviced apartments.

Pacific Place complex is owned and managed by Swire Properties, with the exception of the three hotels (Conrad Hong Kong, Island Shangri-La and JW Marriott Hotel), in each of which it retains a 20 per cent equity interest.

History 
Pacific Place was developed by Swire Properties. Phases One and Two were built on land formerly part of Victoria Barracks, one of the first military compounds in Hong Kong. The land was auctioned by the Hong Kong Government during redevelopment and was successfully bid for by Swire. It was purchased in two tranches in 1985 and 1986 for a total cost of US$1 billion. Phase One opened in 1988. The Conrad International Hotel was completed in 1991. Phase Three, built by Gammon Construction, was completed in 2004. It was developed from old buildings on Star Street, Wan Chai.

Pacific Place underwent a major renovation that was completed in 2011. It involved interior, exterior, and architectural changes designed by Thomas Heatherwick which cost more than HK$2.1 billion.

Phases 
 One
 One Pacific Place
 JW Marriott Hotel Hong Kong
 The Upper House
 Two
 Two Pacific Place
 Island Shangri-La
Two Pacific Place and Island Shangri-La hotel occupy respectively the bottom half and the top half of the tallest tower of the complex, which is 213 metres high and has 56 floors.
 Conrad Hong Kong
 Pacific Place Apartments
 Three
 Three Pacific Place

Shopping centre
The four-level shopping arcade houses both lifestyle and high-end shops in areas ranging from entertainment, dining, accessories to apparel. It houses one department store Harvey Nichols. A footbridge connects it across Queensway to Queensway Plaza and United Centre. It is connected by tunnels to the Admiralty MTR station and Three Pacific Place. Escalators connect it to Hong Kong Park.

See also

 List of tallest buildings in Hong Kong
 Starstreet Precinct

References

Further reading

External links

 

1991 establishments in Hong Kong
Admiralty, Hong Kong
Office buildings in Hong Kong
Shopping malls established in 1991
Shopping centres in Hong Kong
Skyscrapers in Hong Kong
Swire Group
Wan Chai